Twangiza Mine is an open pit gold mine in South Kivu province of the Democratic Republic of the Congo (DRC) which started operations in 2012.
Production has been disrupted by attacks from rebel militias.

Location

Twangiza Mine is in Mwenga Territory, South Kivu.
The mine is at the north end of the  Twangiza-Namoya gold belt, also called the Maniema-South Kivu Gold Belt, which stretches from South Kivu into Maniema.
The belt extends from Twangiza southwest to Namoya in Maniema.

Geology

It contains weakly metamorphized Neoproterozoic sediments, mostly mudstone, trending north–south.
They have been extensively altered by hydrothermal circulation, but may be derived from intrusive alkaline rocks emplaced about 750 Ma along what is today the Albertine Rift.
The Neoproterozoic sediments contain small granitic intrusions from which colonial companies and artisanal miners extracted tin.
The gold is held in sulfides of pyrite and arsenopyrite in both the sediments and the feldspar porphyry sills.
The highest sulfide content is in the axial plane of the fold.

History

In the colonial era alluvial gold deposits were found upstream from the Mwana River to the present day Twangiza deposit.
MGL collected 17,400 samples in total.
In 1976 MGL merged with eight other mining companies to form the Société Minière et Industrielle du Kivu (SOMINKI).
Banro Resource Corporation of Canada acquired control of the property in 1996, and between 1997 and 1998 undertook extensive explorations, including geological mapping, airborne geophysical surveying and diamond drilling.
Soon after this work was completed, President Laurent-Désiré Kabila expropriated the property by presidential decree.
Banro sought compensation, and on 19 April 2002 the DRC government restored the property to Banro with a mining convention that would last until 2027.

Under Banro the mine began commercial production on 1 September 2012.
In February 2017 a group of armed robbers attempted to enter the mine gate. 
Three of the mine's police and one of the robbers were killed.
In 2017 Banro almost went bankrupt and halted operations after a series of militia attacks.
In early 2018 a Canadian court allowed the Banro's main creditors to become its senior shareholders as part of a rescue plan.
These were Baiyin International Investment, controlled by the Chinese government, and Gramercy Funds Management of Connecticut, USA.

In January 2020 Banro sold the Twangize mine to Baiyin International Investments for a nominal $1, since the mine's liabilities were higher than its projected revenues.
Twangiza Mine in 2021 was owned by Shomka Resources, which in turn was owned by a consortium of Shomka Capital (65.5%) and Baiyin International Investment (34.5%).
Shomka Resources is a Hong Kong-based resources company.

Extraction

Twangiza is an open-pit mine.
Processing is done by two secondhand plants from Australia, one for crushing, screening and grinding, and the other for leach, adsorption and elution.
Processing includes gravity separation and carbon-in-leach (CIL) carbon adsorption-desorption-recovery (ADR), with cyanide as a reagent.

Gold production volumes were 98,184oz (2014), 135,532oz (2015), 104,438oz (2016) and 109,871oz (2017).
No reports are available for production after May 2018.
Proven and probable reserves in Twangiza Mine are 1.82 million ounces of metal.

Notes

Citations

Sources

Gold mines in the Democratic Republic of the Congo
South Kivu